John Collings (fl. 1328) was an English Member of Parliament. He represented Derby in 1328.

References

Year of birth missing
14th-century deaths
English MPs 1328
Members of the Parliament of England for Derby
Year of death missing